Jamie Weston (born 8 January 1976 in  Scotland) is a former Scottish rugby union player who played for Glasgow Warriors at the  Scrum-half position.

Rugby Union career

Amateur career

He left Glasgow Warriors to play for Watsonians. He left Watsonians to go to Oxford. He was however playing for Watsonians from 1994.

He was captain of the Oxford University rugby team. Weston turned down a contract with Glasgow Caledonians to go to - and play rugby for - Oxford University. Weston played for Oxford University in the Melrose Sevens. Oxford University Sevens with Weston as captain won the Rosslyn Park Floodlit Sevens in London.

Provincial and professional career

Weston played for Glasgow District as a schoolboy. He went to Kelvinside Academy but then finished his schooling at Merchiston Castle School. He played once for the senior side against North and Midlands in 1996.

He then found himself in the professional Glasgow side when the district turned professional in 1996. He played in European competition for Glasgow in the European Conference - now European Challenge Cup - against Sale Sharks, Clermont, Newport and Agen, scoring a try against Agen. The following season he was named in Glasgow's squad but not used.

He left Glasgow Warriors to play for Watsonians. He left Watsonians to go to Oxford. He was however playing for Watsonians from 1994.

He then was offered another professional contract by Edinburgh Rugby  but lost his place on the merger of Edinburgh with the Border Reivers. However, when the Border team was revived, Weston was to play for the Border Reivers.

International career

He was capped by Scotland Under 21s.

References

External links
 EPCR profile

1976 births
Living people
People educated at Kelvinside Academy
People educated at Merchiston Castle School
Scottish rugby union players
Glasgow Warriors players
Glasgow District (rugby union) players
Oxford University RFC players
Border Reivers players
Edinburgh Rugby players
Watsonians RFC players
Rugby union scrum-halves